Global Underground 021: Deep Dish, Moscow is a DJ mix album in the Global Underground series, compiled and mixed by Deep Dish in 2001. It is a retrospective of a set they played at Club XIII. The Compilation reached #8 Top Heatseekers, #13 Top Electronic Albums, #31 Independent Albums. 021 is also the area code of Tehran, where Sharam of Deep Dish was born. The back of the CD case states, "This CD is dedicated to all innocent people whose lives have been destroyed by extremists."

The mighty Deep Dish became the first ever DJ duo to mix a Global Underground CD with this outstanding album. Sharam and Dubfire were a natural choice for the series having carved out a formidable reputation for themselves via DJ sets, their Yoshitoshi label and remix work.

And just as they have so often done in those remixes, the boys give a succession of vocal cuts a suitably underground feel. Who would have thought Dido would make it onto a GU release?! Yet the dynamic tension between those vocal sensibilities and the brooding, driving electronica of their DJ sets makes this work one of their most celebrated.

Track listing

Disc one
16B featuring Morel - Escape (Driving to Heaven) – 7:19
Soul Providers - Rise (MAS Collective Mix) – 5:24 (probably a typo. The track is in fact: Daiman Fink - UFO Friends)
GHOS - I Can See the Lights – 5:01
El Greco - Night Watch – 5:01
Mechas - Hot (Original Mix) – 4:43
Nat Monday - Waiting (John Creamer & Stephane K Mix) – 6:11
Sshh - Hold That Body (Wally Lopez & Dr. Kucho Mix) – 5:33
Carlos Manaça & Chus & Ceballos - The Strong Rhythm (Urban Tribe Remix) – 5:27
Dido - Thank You (Deep Dish Unreleased Mix) – 7:25
Chab - The Dub Session (A Cooler / A Harder Dub) – 5:19
Iio - Rapture (Deep Dish Space Mix) – 9:54
Dakota - Lost in Brixton – 8:54
Morel - Cabaret Part 1

Disc two
BT - Shame (Way Out West Mix) – 7:09
Professor Okku - Word Unspoken – 4:26
PMT - Deeper Water (Sander Kleinenberg Mix) – 6:01
Envy - Falling – 6:14
Mara - Coming Down – 6:41
Finger Fest Inc. - Autoporno (Original Mix) – 5:41
Dino Lenny - I Feel Stereo – 6:17
Fatboy Slim - Sunset (Bird of Prey) (Markus Schulz Mix) – 7:21
Luzon - Manilla Sunrise (Markus Schulz Mix) – 4:39
Martin Accorsi / Barry Robb - Foundation – 6:08
Pappa & Gilbey - Skin Deep (Vocal Mix) – 5:17
John Creamer & Stephane K - I Wish You Were Here (16B Mix) – 6:36
Envy - Faith (Original Jericho Mix) – 4:51

External links 

Deep Dish (band) compilation albums
Global Underground
2001 compilation albums
DJ mix albums